The Canadian Forces Drug Control Program is a series of regulations established in 1992 to prevent drug use among members of the Canadian Forces (CF), under the broad regulation-making auspices of section 12 of the National Defence Act (NDA). It prohibits CF members from involvement with most drugs, except alcohol and tobacco, purportedly to maintain discipline within the CF, ensure the safety, reliability or health of CF members.  Chapter 20 of Queen's Regulations and Orders (QR&O 20) contains several schemes for drug-testing such as safety-sensitive testing, blind testing, and testing for suspicion under the article for "testing for cause." The regulation enforces administrative and disciplinary action against those who transgress its requirements.

Definitions
QR&O 20 defines a drug as "a controlled substance... in the Controlled Drugs and Substances Act" or any other physiologically or psychologically impairing substance, except for alcohol, prohibited by the Chief of the Defence Staff. It defines "use" as any act of injecting, swallowing, inhaling, smoking, ingesting or otherwise absorbing into the human body.

Application
The policy (QR&O 20.02) asserts that the regulation applies to all officers and non-commissioned members. This should be read in conjunction with section 60 of the NDA which defines the limitations of the disciplinary jurisdiction of the Code of Service Discipline.

Additionally, QR&O 1.03 should be consulted which provides that "Unless the context otherwise requires, and subject to article 1.24 (Regulations and Orders – General), QR&O and all orders and instructions issued to the Canadian Forces under authority of the National Defence Act, apply to: the Regular Force, Special Force, Reserve Force when subject to the code of service discipline..." QR&O 20 states that the order applies to all officers and NCMs - based on standard statutory interpretation, the more specific statute overrides the more general one; the administrative aspects of QR&O 20 likely apply to reservists not performing military functions. It may well be true that this is also the case for disciplinary action applied to reservists not performing military duties, given the wording of QR&O 20.

Prohibition
QR&O 20 prohibits the use of any drug unless it is authorized by a medical professional, is a non-prescription medication used in accordance with accompanying instructions or is required in the course of military duties. These factors are further constrained by the limitation imposed in the notes: a drug may not be used if its use is contrary to another law of Canada.

Whether these constraints imposed by QR&O 20.04 are complete and span the spectrum of drug use is difficult to discern. It is certain that the prohibition in place precludes the use of drugs whose use is not an offence under the Controlled Drugs and Substances Act (e.g. Schedule IV drugs).

Testing schemes
There are a number of means of enforcing QR&O 20 through testing. The policy, however, provides for other means (e.g. education) of promoting the policy's goals. A number of these schemes, in practice, were suspended after the Privacy Commissioner of Canada released a report attacking the validity of drug testing in the Federal sector with an analysis that includes the Canadian Forces.

Deterrent testing
This testing scheme would allow Commanding Officers to order tests on a random basis. Its focus is to deter use of drugs by allowing random seizure of urine samples. The test results from these samples could be used in administrative proceedings.

Safety-sensitive testing
The stated aim of this testing is to randomly detect drug use on the part of those who are in positions that may affect safety. This type has been constitutionally tested and is sound under certain conditions.

Incident-related testing
If drug use is believed to have occurred in relation to an accident or incident and there is not sufficient time to conduct an investigation before the drug in use could be metabolised within the body such that its use could not be detected, Commanding Officer's are authorized to order a test.  The focus of the policy is on discerning all factors that caused an incident and promoting safety; the results from a urine test cannot be used at disciplinary proceedings.

Blind testing
May be conducted under the authority of the Chief of Defence Staff or his delegate against a unit or member. The testing is random and anonymous and is used solely to gauge drug use in the CF for improvement of policy.

Testing for cause
May be conducted by a CO so long as he or she has reasonable grounds to believe that drug use prohibited by QR&O 20 has occurred. The second mandatory component of this test requires a reasonable belief that the presence of a drug may be detected within the time the urine test is administered. It requires Commanding Officers to first give the accused an opportunity to review the reasonable grounds collected and then to provide submissions, should they choose to do so, as to the reasonableness of the grounds developed. These procedural entitlements are prescribed in order to meet the requirements of natural justice.

The results from a test under testing for cause may be used in the disciplinary or administrative context.

QR&O 20.11 para 4 provides that the summary of the reasonable grounds given to the accused is subject to filtering ordinarily required by the Privacy Act and Access to Information Act. To summarize this Federal Court finding it suffices to say that because of the serious interests at stake to the accused, full unfettered access to the Military Police report was essential in order to assist him point out inconsistencies or credibility issues in his accusers. Personnel subject to either administrative (release or C&P) or disciplinary action are therefore entitled to an unedited version of any evidence used against them. Since Testing for Cause mandates that an accused be provided with a summary of the reasonable grounds, it may well be the case that they are entitled to a copy of an MP report into their alleged drug use prior to the seizure of urine.

DND and the CF have made no policy changes to reflect this new requirement; it is entirely possible that the old practice of filtering such information persists.

Control testing
Control testing is an administrative regime, used as a follow up to ensure that members who have been caught using drugs contrary to QR&O 20 abstain from doing so. It is the authority from which follow-up testing is permitted during administrative handling of drug use. Test results may be used in the administrative and disciplinary contexts.

Consequences
The consequences of a positive test may include administrative or disciplinary action. Disciplinary action could consist of a charge under s. 129 of the National Defence Act for failure to observe instructions. A finding of guilty could lead to financial penalties, detention or release in a less-than-honourable fashion.
Administrative action usually would consist of a 1-year period of Counselling and Probation. Release through administrative action is also possible even after a first offence. There is no limitation on the use of both administrative and disciplinary action.

Controversy

Generalities
Both administrative and disciplinary action for drug use contrary to QR&O 20 are very serious. They raise a number of concerns that have either been resolved or are addressed in the following:
- Privacy Commissioner's Report on Drug Testing
- Drug Testing and Legal Implications
- Gayler v. Canada
- Canadian Human Rights Act, Canadian Human Rights Commission, Canadian Human Rights Tribunal
- Canadian Bill of Rights  
- Canadian Charter of Rights and Freedoms

Institutional bias
An investigation instigated under Testing for Cause will most often be conducted by Military Police (MP); it is common practice that the order requiring this investigation is given by the same CO responsible for the ultimate determination as to the reasonableness of the grounds for ordering testing for cause. QR&O 20.11 is ambiguous as to whether or not the "investigating CO" may also conduct the determination for testing for cause. This is a highly troubling ambiguity; where the facts indicate the "investigating CO" was also involved at the testing-for-cause stage, an apprehension of bias or explicit bias may exist. Natural justice in an administrative matter involving an adversarial process and serious outcomes for the accused require a high standard of natural justice; an accused under QR&O 20.11 faces serious (potentially terminal) administrative career consequences, disciplinary proceedings (where his/her liberty may be at stake), and more importantly, the threat of disciplinary action for failing to submit to a test. This threat may engage the security of the person under either the Charter or Bills of Rights.

Some of these issues were analyzed in the Federal Court of Canada which were later brought to appeal in the Federal Court of Appeal. The first-instance decision was rejected, in part, by the Appeals Court on the issues relating to waiver (as unrepresented laymen cannot waive their rights; nor can waiver exist without the breach's grounds at the disposal of the affected party) however, the appellant was ultimately unsuccessful due to a factual prerequisite issue. The Appeals Court consequently chose not to address the validity of the issue of an apprehension of bias. The first-instance decision is not binding on subsequent applicant's seeking review in the Federal Court and the matter remains open for exploration at this level.

Apprehension of bias
The foremost concern in QR&O 20.11 stems from the lack of transparency in the process at the testing stage. The policy suggests that it is the CO who orders an investigation and that it is the CO who determines whether reasonable grounds exist to make an order for testing. It is also the CO who is to receive any submissions from the implicated individual, and it is the CO who will then decide whether to order the actual test. It is a cornerstone of our system of justice that matters be decided by an impartial and independent decision maker. The process of only involving the CO appears to be a clear instance of institutional bias, which operates when the same person who is responsible for the investigation of a matter also decides whether there is enough merit to proceed with a complaint and then adjudicates the complaint.

The test
The test for apprehension of bias is established in:

Further:

The CO may have acted without vexatious or malicious intent. He may have had entirely honourable principles in mind with a complete intent to observe the law. He may also have held the accused in the highest regard and, yet, his involvement at multiple stages of the investigation will still bring rise to an apprehension of bas. His original decision-making process predisposes him to a certain frame of mind. He would therefore be inclined to decide the matter unconsciously in favour of ordering the urine test. This is the rational surrounding the doctrine of apprehension of bias as opposed to bias itself. Behaviour that would tend to contraindicate bias is not a basis to reject a bias argument:

It is a difficult matter to establish case law to support such a proposition. Nevertheless, consider:

Institutional bias as a matter of policy
As a matter of practice and policy the CO will almost always conduct both roles. The obsolesced order in CFAO 19-21 has been replaced with equivalent provisions in  stating:

Clearly, directives within the CF make the CO the predominant agent responsible for the instigation of investigations into drug infractions. The standard of decision making to which the CO is held is a low one as he operates in a low-level capacity similar to that of the Courts; on the other hand, the Chief of Defence Staff (CDS), potentially reviewing these matters during the grievance process, is to be accorded the standard of the closed mind.

In, the following was said about a plurality of roles as it relates to impartiality:

Applicability at the investigative stage
Natural justice applies at investigative stages:

Teleological constraint from parent act
In furtherance of this notion, consider overriding constraint present in sections 273.3 and 273.4 of the National Defence Act in the authorization of search warrants – providing that a CO lacking prior involvement in an investigation should be consulted to authorize a warrant. A literal interpretation of section 273.3 indicates section 273.4 applies only to areas controlled by DND, work lockers, and the personal or movable property of individuals located on in or about any defence property. Furthermore, the order for urine testing is not a warrant in the normal and literal sense.

A literal interpretation of section 273.4 is neither required nor determinative. If urine is not included in the class of things which constitute personal property, a teleological analysis of the interaction of section 273.4 and QR&O 20.11 is necessary. Consider the analysis in, where Mr. Justice Hensen provided the following:

In  at paras 28, 29 and 30, Justice Lysyk made a number of observations that are helpful in this analysis. He stated:

 

It seems a perversity that Parliament would have intended a lower standard in the seizure of bodily fluids than it would have in the search of a locker.

It might be argued that sections s. 273.2-273.5 of the NDA do not apply to a CO when analyzing the standard for a urine seizure as he/she may not be investigating an offence or adjudicating a complaint but rather considering an administrative measure. In reality the adversarial process arising when a CO considers the seizure of urine under QR&O 20, is a judicial or quasi-judicial one and the manner of compelling a urine sample (the written order) is a warrant of sorts – at the very least, within the teleological constraints of s. 273.4.

There is no clear direction in QR&O 20.11 as to whether or not the investigating CO is authorized to order a urine seizure; in this sense QR&O 20.11 is ambiguous and "where the legislation is silent or ambiguous, courts generally infer that the legislators intended the tribunal's process to comport with principles of natural justice." Such a reconsideration suggests the validity of the teleological interaction of QR&O 20.11 and s. 273.4 of the NDA.

In the event that it is found that there does exist a contradiction between s. 273 of the NDA and QR&O 20.11, it is submitted that  provides grounds for the regulation to be struck. In his book on Administrative Law (Chapter 8 section D), Professor Mullan cites  to assert that "the courts sometimes adopt the posture that Parliament or the legislature did not intend the subordinate to devise rules contrary to normal or common law procedural standards." In Joplin, a regulation precluding an accused's use of solicitor to represent him at a police hearing was struck down merely on such a presumption by the judge.

The effect
The CO's involvement at multiple stages of the process gives rise to an apprehension of bias contrary to section 2(e) of the Bill; these procedures appear to abrogate section 2(e) of the Bill as best described in:

Since the urine order occurred at such an early stage (at the investigative stage), rendering "any order" null and void will nullify the urine order. Such a failing could potentially spell doom for any administrative action taken against an accused as the process might be tainted beyond hope of recovery and a subsequent urine order would be of no benefit given the half life of metabolites in the body. In disciplinary proceedings, the test might be excluded but other evidence gathered during the investigation might be sufficient to justify action against the accused. The effect of the taint is questionable as the test is ordered under the low standard of reasonableness as compared to higher standards such as a balance of probability or reasonable and probable grounds.

Security of the person
Section 2(e) of the Bill guarantees the right to procedural fairness in the determination of rights and obligations. This section of the Bill applies to administrative tribunals as per:

As counselling and probation is defined as "the last attempt at salvaging a member's career," it should be viewed as a very serious obligation as it results in the member's career being placed in limbo during its one-year period (i.e. precluding eligibility for training selection and promotion, incentive and pay increases). In  asserted that natural justice was applicable in career settings where there were serious career considerations at stake. This is evidenced in the military career setting in, where C&P was quashed due to an irreparable failing of the audi alteram partem principle.

The threat of disciplinary action for failing to submit to a test or for testing positive for a banned substance is sufficient to invoke the security of the person. In citing, Coultas J. stated the following:

The prison setting can clearly be distinguished from that of the Canadian Forces. In the prison setting, there is little to no expectation of privacy and there are few procedural entitlements. Members of the Canadian Forces should be entitled to a greater procedural entitlement than convicts in a prison:

References

Canadian administrative law
Canadian military law
Drug control law in Canada
Drug testing